Valgini is a small tribe of scarab beetles, formerly considered a subfamily, Valginae. Most species occur in the Old World. They tend to be compact, and scaly or spiny.

List of Subtribes and Genera 

Subtribe Microvalgina
 Ischnovalgus Kolbe, 1897
 Microvalgus Kraatz, 1883
 Stenovalgus Kolbe, 1892
Subtribe Valgina
 Acanthovalgus Kraatz, 1895
 Bivalgus Paulian, 1961
 Chaetovalgus Moser, 1914
 Charitovalgus Kolbe, 1904
 Chromovalgus Kolbe, 1897
 Comythovalgus Kolbe, 1897
 Cosmovalgus Kolbe, 1897
 Dasyvalgoides Endrödi, 1952
 Dasyvalgus Kolbe, 1904
 Euryvalgus Moser, 1908 
 Excisivalgus Endrödi, 1952
 Heterovalgus Krikken, 1978
 Homovalgus Kolbe, 1897
 Hoplitovalgus Kolbe, 1904 
 Hybovalgus Kolbe, 1904 
 Idiovalgus Arrow, 1910
 Lepivalgus Moser, 1914
 Lobovalgus Kolbe, 1897
 Mimovalgus Arrow, 1944
 Oedipovalgus Kolbe, 1897
 Oreoderus Burmeister, 1842
 Oreovalgus Kolbe, 1904
 Podovalgus Arrow, 1910
 Pygovalgus Kolbe, 1884
 Sphinctovalgus Kolbe, 1904
 Tibiovalgus Kolbe, 1904
 Valgoides Fairmaire, 1899
 Valgus Scriba, 1790
 Xenoreoderus Arrow, 1910
 Yanovalgus Nomura, 1952

References

Cetoniinae